Paul Shyre  (8 March 1926–19 November 1989) was an American director and playwright who received a Special Tony Award and won a Regional Emmy Award. He is noted for the plays Hizzoner, Will Rogers' USA and The President Is Dead.

Shyre graduated from the University of Florida and the American Academy of Dramatic Arts.  He was a professor of theater arts at Cornell University.

Shyre adapted to the stage, directed and co-produced the Sean O'Casey novels, Pictures in the Hallway, I Knock at the Door and Drums Under the Windows.  He also  wrote and directed A Whitman Portrait and  An Unpleasant Evening With H.L. Mencken.

Awards
1957 Drama Desk Award for Pictures in the Hallway
1957 Obie Award, special citation for bringing O'Casey to Off-Broadway; for his adaptations of I Knock at the Door, Pictures in the Hallway, and USA
1957 Special Tony Award
1987 New York Emmy Award shared with Robert H. Rines for the television and later Broadway play Hizzoner! about Mayor Fiorello La Guardia.

References

1926 births
1989 deaths
20th-century American dramatists and playwrights
American theatre directors
University of Florida alumni
Cornell University faculty
Regional Emmy Award winners
Obie Award recipients
Special Tony Award recipients